Prantik is a multi-topic Assamese language magazine published fortnightly from Guwahati since 1981. It plays a vital role in the socio-political lives of the people of Assam, India. 

The founding chief editor of the magazine was Bhabendranath Saikia. The founding editor was Pradip Baruah, who is also its present editor after more than three decades.

Presently, it is still being published as a leading Assamese fortnightly. Some of its articles include "Buddhi Jukti" and "Letters from Canada". Pages from Bhabendra Nath Saikia's personal diary are published at the last page of each issue.

References

1981 establishments in Assam
Assamese-language mass media
Assamese-language magazines
Assamese literature
Biweekly magazines published in India
Monthly magazines published in India
Magazines established in 1981